Heaton Chapel railway station serves the Heaton Chapel and Heaton Moor districts of Stockport, Greater Manchester, England. It opened as Heaton Chapel & Heaton Moor in 1852 by the London & North Western Railway. It was renamed Heaton Chapel by British Rail on 6 May 1974.

Services
As of December 2022, Heaton Chapel is served by one Northern Trains service per hour from each of Crewe, Alderley Edge, Buxton and Hazel Grove to Manchester Piccadilly.

The station has a ticket office, which is closed at weekends. When this is closed, access to the Manchester-bound platform is only possible via a ramp from Tatton Road South.

In May 2016, the roof collapsed onto the stairs of the Manchester-bound platform. This resulted in the stairs being closed on both platforms, leaving access only via long ramps to the platforms. The roof has now been repaired and reinstated.

References

Further reading

External links

Former London and North Western Railway stations
DfT Category E stations
Railway stations in Great Britain opened in 1852
Railway stations in the Metropolitan Borough of Stockport
Northern franchise railway stations